Just Go is the ninth studio album by American singer Lionel Richie. It was first released by Island Records on March 10, 2009 in the United Kingdom. Richie worked with Tricky Stewart and Norwegian production duo StarGate on the majority of the album, which features additional production from Akon, David Foster, and John Ewbank as well as writing credits by Ne-Yo, Johntá Austin, The-Dream, and Espen Lind. Although Richie had little writing involvement of the songs for Just Go, he did write "Eternity", which is also included on the tribute album Change Is Now: Renewing America's Promise.

The album earned generally positive reviews and debuted at number 24 on the US Billboard 200 and number nine on Top R&B/Hip-Hop Albums. Just Go also entered the top ten in Austria, Germany, and the United Kingdom. By May 2012, it had sold 95,000 copies in the US, according to Nielsen SoundScan, and additional 60,000 units in the UK. The album was preceded by lead single "Good Morning" and follow-up "Just Go" as well as "I'm in Love" and the promotional singles "Face in the Crowd", "Forever and Ever" and "I'm Not Okay".

Critical reception

Upon release, Just Go received positive reviews from music critics. At Metacritic, which assigns a normalized rating out of 100 to reviews from mainstream critics, the album has an average score of 68 based on 6 reviews, indicating "generally favorable reviews." Allmusic editor Andy Kellman wrote that "introducing a 60-year-old artist to a younger audience with new material is asking for a lot, but Richie's devoted fanbase will find plenty to like. Just Go, slightly more so than [previous album] Coming Home, tends to be a happy (and comforting) medium between Richie's familiar approach and contemporary R&B." Caroline Sullivan, writing for The Guardian, remarked that Just Go "finds Richie in reliably smooth voice, ruminating placidly about love. Fair enough; that's what he's for, and he's game enough to couch it [...] He's rarely sounded so unruffled. What would it be like if he let go a bit?"

New York Times journalist Nate Chinen felt that while Just Go came across like "a textbook adult-contemporary album, it also lends credible emotional footing to the songs. It’s one reason that Mr. Richie doesn’t sound out of his element singing on tracks provided by contemporary R&B hit makers, complete with up-to-the-minute production." People critics Chuck Arnold and Joey Bartolomeo wrote that Akon, The-Dream and Stargate "put a fresh but familiar spin on Richie’s sound. Still, the old guy falls into a bit of a midtempo rut." Similarly, Entertainment Weekly critic Leah Greenblatt found that Richie's collaborators "may be top dogs on their own territory, but they don’t have much on the old tricks of the Commodore-turned-1980s solo star. On his ninth studio album, undifferentiated swaths of midtempo digital groove leave one longing for the (relative) analog authenticity of vintage Lionel."

Chart performance
In the United States, Just Go debuted at number 24 on the US Billboard 200 and number nine on the Top R&B/Hip-Hop Albums. It became Richie's fifth top ten entry on the latter chart and sold 95,000 copies in the US. In the United Kingdom, it peaked at number 10 on the UK Albums Chart and was certified silver by the British Phonographic Industry (BPI), indicating sales in excess of 60,000 copies.

Track listing

Notes
 signifies an co-producer

Charts

Certifications and sales

References

2009 albums
Albums produced by Stargate
Albums produced by Tricky Stewart
Lionel Richie albums
Island Records albums